Eugenio Siena (1 April 1905 - 15 May 1938) was an Italian racecar driver from Milan.

A cousin of Giuseppe Campari, he was a mechanic and testdriver  for Alfa Romeo (assistant to Enzo Ferrari).
Next, he  joined Scuderia Ferrari 1930–34.
Siena won the 1932 Spa 24 Hours with Antonio Brivio in Alfa Romeo 8C, and Mille Miglia with
Tazio Nuvolari in  1934.  He managed the Scuderia Siena team and raced Maserati 1934–36, then voiturette.

He died in an accident at the 1938 Tripoli Grand Prix, driving a Tipo 312.

References

Grand Prix drivers
Mille Miglia drivers
24 Hours of Spa drivers
Racing drivers from Milan
Racing drivers who died while racing
Sport deaths in Libya
1905 births
1938 deaths
European Championship drivers